Seafarer Fiberglass Yachts, Inc. (usually called Seafarer Yachts) was an American sailboat importer, distributor and boat builder based in Huntington, New York. The company specialized in the design and manufacture of fiberglass sailboats.

The company was founded in the 1950s as an importer, started building its own sailboats in 1965 and went out of business in 1985, following the early 1980s recession in the United States and the downturn in the sailboat market.

History
The company started off in the 1950s as an importer and distributor of sailboats built in Amsterdam, Netherlands by DeVries Lentsch. The company then set up its own manufacturing operation in a building in Huntington, New York that had been built as a supermarket and starting building sailboats in 1964. Many of the boats built were designed by James A. McCurdy and Philip ("Bodie") H. Rhodes of McCurdy & Rhodes, like the Seafarer 22, although some boats were by Sparkman & Stephens, like the Sailmaster 22.

Boats 
Summary of boats imported or built by Seafarer Yachts:

See also
List of sailboat designers and manufacturers

References

External links

Seafarer Yachts